Paul William Harragon OAM (born 12 October 1968) nicknamed Chief or Chief Harragon is an Australian rugby league football identity. A former Australian international and New South Wales State of Origin representative forward, he played rugby for the Newcastle Knights whom he captained to the 1997 ARL premiership. Harragon was a regular presenter of The Footy Show and as of 2013 is the Chairman of the Newcastle Knights Advisory Board.

Background
Harragon was born in Kurri Kurri, New South Wales, Australia.

Playing career
Harragon was raised in the New South Wales town of Kurri Kurri, and played for Lakes United in the Newcastle competition.  He joined the Newcastle Knights in 1988 and made his first grade debut in 1989 against the Balmain Tigers.

He represented and captained Country, New South Wales and Australia. He was named man-of-the-match in the second game of the 1994 State of Origin series. At the end of the 1994 NSWRL season, he went on the 1994 Kangaroo tour.

Harragon captained the Knights to the 1997 ARL premiership title in a grand final against Manly-Warringah Sea Eagles, despite suffering from serious headaches and seizures throughout most of the season.

Harragon excelled at the State of Origin level, making 20 consecutive appearances for New South Wales between Game I 1992 and Game II 1998. He holds the record for the second most consecutive Origin games by a New South Welshman (Danny Buderus played 21 consecutive State of Origin games between game I 2002 and game III 2008), and most appearances by a NSW forward.

Between 1992 & 1998, Harragon was a frequent choice to play for the Kangaroos. During the 1992 Great Britain Lions tour of Australia and New Zealand, he helped Australia retain The Ashes. All up he scored three tries while representing his country. He missed the 1995 World Cup final due to injury, with Gary Larson being flown in to replace him. That year it was reported that Harragon would receive $1.2 million to secure his loyalty to the Australian Rugby League in addition to $700,000 per season for the next three seasons.

In 1996, he captained the team in a World Cup Test against South Africa, and in 1997 he played in a match against the "Rest of the World".

In 1999, Harragon participated in the first rugby league game to be played at Stadium Australia. Later that year, after playing 169 first grade games in a career lasting ten years, Harragon retired due to an ongoing knee injury mid-season.

Post-playing
Harragon has since become a media personality, working for local Newcastle station NBN Television, before joining Channel 9 as a member of The Footy Show panel (on which his "That's Gold" segment became immensely popular), and as a rugby league commentator. Following format changes to the programme before the 2009 season, Harragon decided to leave the production.

Harragon was also a director of and is a life member of the Newcastle Knights, and is spokesman for NIB Health Funds and Subway.

In 2016, Harragon became a contestant on Network Ten's second series of I'm a Celebrity...Get Me Out of Here! in which he placed second.

Harragon lives in Newcastle with his wife Pam, his daughter Molly and two sons, Jackson and George.

Discography

References

Further reading

External links
 
 State of Origin Official website Rugby League Player Stats
 NRL points
 'That's Gold' Lyrics

1968 births
Living people
Australia national rugby league team captains
Australia national rugby league team players
Australian rugby league players
Country New South Wales Origin rugby league team players
I'm a Celebrity...Get Me Out of Here! (Australian TV series) participants
Lakes United Seagulls players
New South Wales Rugby League State of Origin players
Newcastle Knights captains
Newcastle Knights players
Recipients of the Medal of the Order of Australia
Rugby league players from Kurri Kurri
Rugby league props
Rugby league second-rows
Valentine-Eleebana Red Devils players